Battery D, 2nd Illinois Light Artillery Regiment, was an artillery battery that served in the Union Army during the American Civil War.

Service
Battery D was organized Cairo, Illinois on December 17, 1861 and mustered in for a three-year enlistment.

The battery was attached to District of Cairo to February 1862. 1st Division, District of Cairo, February 1862. 3rd Brigade, 1st Division, District of West Tennessee, to April 1862. Artillery, 1st Division, Army of the Tennessee, to July 1862. Artillery, 1st Division, District of Jackson, Tennessee, to November 1862. District of Jackson, Tennessee, XIII Corps, Department of the Tennessee, to December 1862. Artillery, 1st Division, XVI Corps, to May 1863. 2nd Brigade, District of Memphis, Tennessee, 5th Division, XVI Corps, to December 1863. 3rd Brigade, 1st Cavalry Division, XVI Corps, to January 1864. District of Memphis, Tennessee, XVI Corps, January 1864. Artillery, 4th Division, XVI Corps, to March 1864. Decatur, Alabama, District of Northern Alabama, Department of the Cumberland, to November 1864.

Battery D mustered out of service in Louisville, Kentucky on November 21, 1864.  Veterans and recruits were transferred to Battery K, 2nd Illinois Light Artillery Regiment.

Detailed service
Duty at Cairo, Illinois, until February 1862. Expedition from Cairo into Kentucky January 16–21, 1862. Operations against Fort Henry, Tennessee, February 2–6. Investment and capture of Fort Donelson, Tennessee, February 12–16. Moved to Savannah, then to Pittsburg Landing, Tennessee, March 5–25. Battle of Shiloh, April 6–7. Advance on and siege of Corinth, Mississippi, April 29-May 30. March to Jackson, Tennessee, June 5–8, and duty there until November. Grant's Central Mississippi Campaign November and December. Action at Davis Mills, Wolf River, Mississippi, December 21. Post duty at Grand Junction until January 1864. Expedition to Senatobia, Mississippi, May 21–26, 1863. Senatobia May 23. Moved to Memphis, Tennessee, then to Vicksburg, Mississippi, January 1864. Meridian Campaign February 3-March 2. Ordered to Decatur, Alabama, March 1864, and duty there until November 1864. Action at Pond Springs, near Courtland, May 27, and at Decatur June 1. Siege of Decatur October 26–29. Ordered to Louisville, Kentucky, November 1.

Casualties
The battery lost a total of 19 enlisted men during service; 6 men killed or mortally wounded, 13 died of disease.

Commanders
 Captain Jasper M. Dresser - promoted March 28, 1862
 Captain James P. Timmony - resigned April 17, 1862
 Captain Fritz Anneke - promoted December 18, 1862
 Captain Charles S. Cooper - mustered out November 1, 1864

See also

 List of Illinois Civil War units
 Illinois in the Civil War

References
 Dyer, Frederick H. A Compendium of the War of the Rebellion (Des Moines, IA: Dyer Pub. Co.), 1908.
Attribution

External links
 Roster of Battery D, 2nd Illinois Light Artillery transcribed by Jim Willison

Military units and formations established in 1861
Military units and formations disestablished in 1864
Units and formations of the Union Army from Illinois
1861 establishments in Illinois
Artillery units and formations of the American Civil War